McDull, Kung Fu Kindergarten (麥兜響噹噹) is a 2009 animated Hong Kong film directed by Brian Tse. Telling the story of the fictional piglet McDull entering a kung fu academy, the film is the fourth in the line of film starring McDull.

Plot 
The story begins as archaeologists discover a crudely made artifact while doing an archaeological study before the entire area was to be flooded following the construction of the Three Gorges Dam. The archaeologists identify it as being made by Mak-zi (also known as "McFat"), an ancient Chinese philosopher who had invented many things, but were arguably ahead of its time - for example, a myriad of electronic devices before the discovery of electricity. However, the crudeness of the artifact has led to the artifact being rejected for every museum in China and abroad, and thus, unwilling to destroy it, the artifact was set on a barge, continuously moving along the Yangtze River. The story continues on to Mak-zi's descendant 18 generations later, McDull (Kwok Kwan Yin), a kindergartener living in Hong Kong.

Due to mounting debts from failed ventures and economic hardships, McDull's mother, Mrs. Mak (Sandra Ng), decides to leave their home in Tai Kok Tsui to find fortune in the mainland. Arriving in Wuhan, Mrs. Mak, knowing that she cannot continue to take care of McDull while trying to make a living, decides to enroll McDull in the Spring Flowers Gate, a boarding Taoist martial arts academy in the Wudang Mountains, while she continues to ply her trade in Wuhan, Shanghai, Suzhou, and Hangzhou. McDull finds it hard to fit in, being ostracized by his peers at the academy due to being a Hong Konger. However, a mysterious Brother Panda (Anthony Wong) encourages him to get closer and make new friends with his peers.

McDull eventually gets used to being liked by his friends, but when news of a prestigious martial arts competition, the International Kindergarten Martial Arts Competition, is to take place, nearly all of the students consider leaving the academy, McDull included. On the way down the mountain (as the mountain itself has no modern conveniences), McDull intends to call his mother to tell her that he was quitting the academy, but after a talk with the master's assistant (The Pancakes), McDull learns about his master's plight: the headmaster had been a martial arts prodigy, mastering all forms of Chinese martial arts before the age of 20. When a published article by international action star Pruce Lee (a play on Bruce Lee) that claims that Chinese martial arts was on decline and was more suited for show than actual combat, the headmaster had respectfully disagreed. A war of wards was exchanged, and the two agreed to a match together. However, because of the political situation in China at the time, the battle, which would be later known as "The Battle of Luohu", was held at the Sham Chun River, the border between Hong Kong and Shenzhen. The two battled all night, but the match was eventually stopped by a Zen master. Returning home, the headmaster had strongly believed that he had lost the encounter, and thus went into seclusion, trying to modernize Taoist Kung Fu with little success. He then turned his attentions to opening the Spring Flowers Gate, taking on the guise of Brother Panda to get new recruits and to comfort students at the academy. McDull, moved by his sacrifices, decides to return to training, and calls his mother to tell her to attend the competition.

Eventually, the day of the competition arrives. While at the competition, McDull notices his friend from Hong Kong, May, who had enrolled in a "wire-fu" summer camp sponsored by Yuen Woo-Ping, also competing in the contest. Meanwhile, the headmaster has also received a revelation: at the competition, the headmaster of a rival school greets him, stating that he was a student of Pruce Lee. He goes on to state that Pruce had thought highly of the headmaster, and believed that the headmaster had won their encounter. Because of this, he had spent his last years extensively studying Taoist martial arts, and had written a book about the subject, which was dedicated to him.

Meanwhile, the Mak-zi artifact had wound up at the site of the competition, and, in front of a large televised audience just as McDull's match was about to begin, the artifact suddenly comes to life, revealing to itself as a crudely made clock in the shape of a chicken powered by cow feces which could count 100,000 years, 100 years at a time, using a complex holographic system. Inspired by the sight before her, Mrs. Mak decides to move back to Hong Kong to start a new business. McDull, having been beaten up badly in the competition, also returned to Hong Kong, having discovered Mak-zi's original blueprints for the clock in the meantime. Having returned home, McDull proceeded to build a new clock using the blueprints as a guide.

The story is concluded by a flashback from an adult May, who had gone on to become an office worker, suddenly noticing McDull's clock in the sky. Taking a break from her mundane life, she traces the clock to its location, and find a quaint restaurant in the middle of Hong Kong's concrete jungle, run by the adult McDull.

Throughout the film, viewers were also treated into various stories involving Mak-zi, in a pseudo-documentary style, narrated by Jim Chim.

Voice Actors 

 Kwok Kwan Yin as McDull
 Chen Lok Yuen as May
 Anthony Wong as Daoist,Professor and Panda Brother
 The Pancakes as Miss Chan
 Wan Kwong as Mcdull's Great-Grandfather
 Sandra Ng as Mrs. Mak
 Yu Chun Pak as Goose

External links
 

2009 films
Hong Kong animated films
Films based on comic strips
Yellow Bus
Chinese children's films
Cantonese-language films
McDull
2009 animated films
2000s Hong Kong films